In July 2022, Ireland played a three-Test series against New Zealand as part of the 2022 mid-year rugby union internationals. Ireland also played two matches against the Māori All Blacks. This was Ireland's first tour since their tour to Australia in 2018, their first tour to New Zealand since 2012, and their first encounter against New Zealand since November 2021.

In the first Test, at Auckland’s Eden Park, New Zealand comfortably beat the visitors 42-19.

In the second Test, in Dunedin, Ireland prevailed by 23-12 scoring their first victory against the All Blacks on New Zealand soil, their fourth win over New Zealand. 

The following week Ireland became just the fifth touring side to achieve a series win in New Zealand, beating the All Blacks 32-22 in Wellington for a 2–1 series victory. The feat had only been previously accomplished by South Africa (1937), Australia (1949, 1986), the British & Irish Lions (1971), and France (1994).

Fixtures

Squads
Note: Ages, caps and clubs are as per 17 July 2022, the day after the end of the tour.

Ireland
On 14 June, Ireland named a 40-man squad for their 3-test series for the New Zealand tour.

Coaching team:
 Head coach:  Andy Farrell
 Assistant and attack coach:  Mike Catt
 Defence coach:  Simon Easterby
 Forwards coach:  Paul O'Connell
 Scrum coach:  John Fogarty

New Zealand
On 13 June the All Blacks' squad was announced, including six potential debutants. On 17 June New Zealand Rugby (NZR) announced lock Josh Lord had been ruled out of the tour with a ruptured ACL. On 27 June it was announced head coach Ian Foster, assistant coaches John Plumtree and Scott McLeod, and centres David Havili and Jack Goodhue had been ruled out of the first test after testing positive for Covid-19. Former Ireland head coach,  Joe Schmidt was called in to coach New Zealand ahead of their first test against Ireland. Braydon Ennor was called into the squad as a midfield cover.

Coaching team:
 Head coach:  Ian Foster
 Attack coach:  Brad Mooar
 Forwards coach:  John Plumtree
 Scrum coach:  Greg Feek

Matches

First match vs Māori All Blacks

First test

Notes:
 Leicester Fainga'anuku and Pita Gus Sowakula (New Zealand) made their international debuts.
 Finlay Bealham was originally named on the Ireland bench, but was replaced on match day by Tom O'Toole.

Second test

Notes:
 This was Ireland's first ever victory over New Zealand on New Zealand soil.
 Scott Barrett (New Zealand) earned his 50th test cap.
 Folau Fakatava and Aidan Ross (New Zealand) made their international debuts.

Second match vs Māori All Blacks

Notes:
 This was Ireland's first ever victory over the Māori All Blacks.
 Finlay Bealham was originally named on the Ireland bench, but was replaced on match day by Michael Bent.

Third test

Notes:
 New Zealand's Scott Barrett (starting XV) and Aidan Ross had both been named in the team, but withdrew from the team ahead of kickoff. Akira Ioane replaced Barrett in the starting XV with Tupou Vaa'i joining the bench, whilst Karl Tu'inukuafe replaced Ross.
 Roger Tuivasa-Sheck (New Zealand) made his international debut.
 Ireland won a first test series in New Zealand for the first time in history.
 This was the first time since 1994, and just the fifth in history, that New Zealand lost a home test series.
 This was the first time since 1998 that New Zealand lost back-to-back home test matches.
 This was the first time that Ireland won back-to-back matches against New Zealand.
 With this win, Ireland claimed top spot in the World Rugby Rankings for the first time since 2019.

See also
 2022 July rugby union tests
 History of rugby union matches between Ireland and New Zealand

Notes

References

Ireland national rugby union team tours
Ireland
New Zealand
Ireland
Ireland national rugby union team tours of New Zealand
Ireland tour of New Zealand